Jamnica  is a village in the administrative district of Gmina Kamionka Wielka, within Nowy Sącz County, Lesser Poland Voivodeship, in southern Poland.

The village has an approximate population of 720.

References

Jamnica